Xue Ya'nan is a professional Chinese footballer who currently plays as a defensive midfielder or full-back for Dalian LFTZ Huayi.

Club career
Xue Ya'nan started his career with Dalian Shide and was loaned out to their youth team called Dalian Shide Siwu FC who were allowed to take part in Singapore's 2008 S.League. Upon his return to Dalian Shide he would be given his chance to make his debut for the team in the last game of the season on October 31, 2009, in a league game against Qingdao Jonoon that Dalian lost 3–1.

On 30 November 2012, Dalian Shide were acquired by Aerbin Group and merged with local rivals Dalian Aerbin With the significantly larger squad in March 2013, Xue transferred to Qingdao Hainiu in the China League Two. His transfer to Qingdao would be successful, and he would secure promotion to the second tier at the conclusion of the season as well as win the division title in his first season with the team.

On 30 January 2016, Xue transferred to his hometown club Dalian Transcendence in the China League One.

On 10 February 2018, Xue transferred to Chinese Super League side Changchun Yatai.

Career statistics 
Statistics accurate as of match played 31 December 2020.

Honours

Club
Qingdao Hainiu
 China League Two: 2013

Changchun Yatai
 China League One: 2020

References

External links

Player profile at sodasoccer.com

1990 births
Living people
Chinese footballers
Footballers from Dalian
Dalian Shide F.C. players
Dalian Professional F.C. players
Qingdao F.C. players
Dalian Transcendence F.C. players
Changchun Yatai F.C. players
Chinese Super League players
China League One players
China League Two players
Association football defenders
Association football midfielders